Sir Jai Singh Prabhakar  (14 June 1882 – 19 May 1937), was a ruler of Naruka Kshatriya dynasty and the Maharaja of the princely state of Alwar from 1892 to 1937. The only son of the previous ruler, Sir Mangal Singh Prabhakar Bahadur, Sir Jai Singh initially was noted as brilliant, erudite and charming. However, he was later forced into exile.  He died in 1937 at the age of 54. He was succeeded by a distant relative, Tej Singh Prabhakar Bahadur.

He was educated in Mayo College, Ajmer. He was a highly regarded Indian English orator and scholar. He lived a lavish lifestyle and spent treasury money  on hunting and palaces such as Sariska Palace (now a tiger reserve and hotel). He assisted the farming community with the construction of a number of bunds (irrigation dams).

Imperial Service

Sir Jai Singh took pride in his State's infantry regiments and had them sent to China during the anti-Christian uprising in China and in the following relief operations. Alwar Lancers units  served in the First World War. Recognising his services, he was appointed a Knight Grand Commander of the Order of the Indian Empire (GCIE) by the British in 1919.

He features in the oil on canvas painting by Douglas Chandor, Prime Ministers of the Imperial Conference (October 1923).

Titles
 1882-1892: Yuvaraja Shri Jai Singh Sahib, Yuvaraja Sahib of Alwar
 1892-1909: His Highness Raj Rishi Shri Sawai Maharaja Jai Singh Veerendra Shiromani Dev Bharat Prabhakar Bahadur, Maharaja of Alwar
 1909-1911: His Highness Raj Rishi Shri Sawai Maharaja Sir Jai Singh Veerendra Shiromani Dev Bharat Prabhakar Bahadur, Maharaja of Alwar, KCSI
 1911-1915: His Highness Raj Rishi Shri Sawai Maharaja Sir Jai Singh Veerendra Shiromani Dev Bharat Prabhakar Bahadur, Maharaja of Alwar, KCSI, KCIE
 1915-1919: Hon Lieutenant-Colonel His Highness Raj Rishi Shri Sawai Maharaja Sir Jai Singh Veerendra Shiromani Dev Bharat Prabhakar Bahadur, Maharaja of Alwar, KCSI, KCIE
 1919-1921: Hon Lieutenant-Colonel His Highness Raj Rishi Shri Sawai Maharaja Sir Jai Singh Veerendra Shiromani Dev Bharat Prabhakar Bahadur, Maharaja of Alwar, GCIE, KCSI
 1921-1924: Hon Colonel His Highness Raj Rishi Shri Sawai Maharaja Sir Jai Singh Veerendra Shiromani Dev Bharat Prabhakar Bahadur, Maharaja of Alwar, GCIE, KCSI
 1924-1937: Hon Colonel His Highness Raj Rishi Shri Sawai Maharaja Sir Jai Singh Veerendra Shiromani Dev Bharat Prabhakar Bahadur, Maharaja of Alwar, GCSI, GCIE

Honours
 Delhi Durbar Gold Medal-1903
 Delhi Durbar Gold Medal-1911
 Knight Grand Commander of the Order of the Indian Empire (GCIE)-1919  (KCIE-1911)
 Knight Grand Commander of the Order of the Star of India (GCSI)-1924  (KCSI-1909 New Year Honours)

References

External links

Knights Grand Commander of the Order of the Star of India
Knights Grand Commander of the Order of the Indian Empire
1882 births
1937 deaths
Jai Singh